General elections were held in Nepal on 20 November 2022 to elect the 275 members of the House of Representatives. There were two ballots in the election; one to elect 165 members from single-member constituencies via FPTP, and the other to elect the remaining 110 members from a single nation-wide constituency via party-list proportional representation.

The election was held alongside provincial elections for the seven provincial assemblies.

After power sharing talks between the outgoing Democratic Left Alliance broke down on 25 December 2022, CPN (Maoist Centre) chairman Pushpa Kamal Dahal became prime minister, its eight member cabinet consisting of MPs from his party, CPN (UML), Rastriya Swatantra Party and Janamat Party, with the confidence and supply of RPP, JSP, NUP and three independents.

Background
The fifth House of Representatives elected in 2017 had a five year term ending in March 2023. In May 2018, the CPN (Unified Marxist–Leninist) and CPN (Maoist Centre) parties merged to form the Nepal Communist Party. The merger between the two coalition partners took their total strength in the House of Representatives to 174. The leaders of the two parties had an agreement to share the post of Prime Minister with the CPN (Unified Marxist–Leninist) chairman KP Sharma Oli handing over the post to Maoist Centre chairman Pushpa Kamal Dahal after two and a half years. On 20 November 2019, the two leaders agreed to let Oli complete his full term as prime minister. In a secretariat meeting of the Nepal Communist Party on 14 November 2020, Dahal presented a political document which accused Oli not following party orders and being individualistic. In response to Dahal, Oli rejected Dahal's accusations and presented his own political document which accused Dahal of not letting Oli run the government. As the strife within the party continued, Oli requested President Bidhya Devi Bhandari to dissolve the House of Representatives on 20 December 2020 as a no-confidence motion was being prepared against him. In protest of the decision by Oli, seven ministers of the cabinet resigned.

The House was reinstated on 23 February 2021 but on 7 March 2021, deciding on a separate writ, the Supreme Court annulled the decision of the Election Commission to grant the name Nepal Communist Party to the party created by merger of the CPN (Unified Marxist–Leninist) and CPN (Maoist Centre), and positioned them to their pre merger status. The CPN (Maoist Centre) withdrew its support from the government on 5 May 2021 and Oli failed to obtain a vote of confidence while a faction of his own party boycotted the vote.

On 13 May 2021, Oli was appointed minority Prime Minister as the leader of the party in parliament with the highest seats. Rather than retake a vote of confidence, Oli started the process of formation of government through provision of Article 76(5), which was challenged in the Supreme Court. Sher Bahadur Deuba claimed signed support of 149 MPs, including 26 from the CPN (Unified Marxist–Leninist) and 13 from the People's Socialist Party, Nepal. Oli claimed support of all MPs of the CPN (UML) and the People's Socialist Party, Nepal. President Bhandari decided on 22 May 2021 that both claims were inadequate and announced the dissolution of House, leading to widespread opposition. On 12 July 2021, the Supreme Court ruled the dissolution of parliament invalid, while ordering the appointment of Deuba as Prime Minister, as per article 76(5), by submitting 149 signatures to the President, which is a majority of 271 members present in the House. 

A cabinet decision on 4 August 2022 decided on holding the next general election on 20 November 2022. The house was finally dissolved on 18 September 2022 after the completion of its five-year term.

Timetable
The key dates are listed below:

Electoral system
The 275 members of the legislature are elected by two methods; 165 are elected from single-member constituencies by first-past-the-post voting and 110 seats are elected by closed list proportional representation from a single nationwide constituency. Voters receive separate ballot papers for the two methods. A party or electoral alliance has to pass the election threshold of 3% of the overall valid vote to be allocated a seat in the proportional vote. Nepal uses the Sainte-Laguë method to allocate proportional seats.

Voting is limited to Nepali citizens aged 18 or over of sound mind and not having been declared ineligible under federal election fraud and punishment laws.

Eligibility to vote 
To vote in the general election, one must be:
 on the electoral roll
 aged 18 or over on 19 December 2022
 a citizen of Nepal
 of sound mind
 not ineligible as per federal election fraud and punishment laws

Pre-election arrangement

Electoral alliances and parties

Democratic Left Alliance 
The coalition government of Nepali Congress, CPN (Maoist Centre), CPN (Unified Socialist), People's Socialist Party and Rastriya Janamorcha decided to form an alliance to contest the parliamentary elections on 5 August 2022. Later on August 15, Nepal Socialist Party led by former prime Minister Baburam Bhattarai decided to contest the election under the election symbol and manifesto of CPN (Maoist Centre). On October 9, on the deadline of the candidate nominations, People's Socialist Party broke away from the alliance and the alliance decided to support Loktantrik Samajwadi Party in 7 seats. The alliance also supported Ghanashyam Bhusal in Rupandehi 1 and Prabhu Sah in Rautahat 3 who ran as dissident candidates from CPN (UML) from seats allotted to CPN (Maoist Centre). After the candidacy of Raju Gurung of Unified Socialist was scrapped by the Election Commission, the alliance decided to support Rastriya Janamukti Party candidate Keshav Bahadur Thapa in Rupandehi 2. Rastriya Janamorcha however decided to support the candidate from Nepal Majdoor Kisan Party.

CPN (UML) + People's Socialist Party 
CPN (UML) decided to support People's Socialist Party in 7 seats on 9 October 2022. The CPN (UML) also decided to support Rastriya Prajtantra Party candidates in Jhapa 5, Rupandehi 1 and Banke 2 and decided to field Rastriya Prajtantra Party Nepal chairman Kamal Thapa in Makwanpur 1 under their election symbol. The party also supported dissident candidate from Nepali Congress, Dinesh Koirala in Chitwan 3, Karna Bahadur Malla of Nepali Congress (B.P.) in Dadeldhura 1 and Hridayesh Tripathi of the People's Progressive Party in Parasi 1.

Others

2017–2022 MPs contesting under a different political affiliation

2017–2022 MPs not standing for re-election 

CPN (UML)

 Bhim Bahadur Rawal
 Khagaraj Adhikari
 Kedar Sigdel
 Pabitra Niraula Kharel
 Jaya Kumar Rai
 Parbat Gurung
 Ganesh Kumar Pahadi
 Krishna Prasad Dahal
 Jagat Bahadur Bishwakarma
 Bhupendra Bahadur Thapa
 Dal Bahadur Rana
 Nanda Lal Rokka Chhetri
 Raj Bahadur Budhathoki
 Nawaraj Rawat
 Lal Bahadur Thapa
 Bhairav Bahadur Singh
 Tham Maya Thapa
 Kumari Tulsi Thapa
 Mohan Baniya
 Radha Kumari Gyawali
 Binda Pandey
 Goma Devkota
 Man Kumari GC
 Mayadevi Neupane
 Bishnu Sharma
 Sarita Neupane
 Maina Kumari Bhandari
 Tirtha Gautam
 Shiva Maya Tumbahangphe
 Sujata Shakya
 Bina Kumari Shrestha
 Nabina Lama
 Shanti Maya Tamang
 Kumari Meche
 Bimala Bishwakarma
 Bimala BK
 Sanu Shiva
 Aasha Kumari BK
 Motilal Dugad
 Sarita Kumari Giri
 Rekha Kumari

Nepali Congress

 Karma Ghale
 Lalkaji Gurung
 Jeep Tshering Lama
 Pramila Rai
 Mahendra Kumari Limbu
 Hira Gurung
 Mina Subba
 Divyamani Rajbhandari
 Satya Narayan Sharma
 Mohan Panday
 Ram Bahadur Bista
 Dila Sangraula
 Meena Pandey
 Uma Regmi
 Rangmati Shahi
 Gyan Kumari Chhantyal
 Namita Kumari Chaudhary
 Smriti Narayan Chaudhary
 Man Bahadur Bishwakarma
 Min Bahadur Bishwakarma
 Prakash Rasaili
 Sujata Pariyar
 Laxmi Pariyar
 Bimala Nepali
 Atahar Kamal Musalman
 Sarbat Aara Khanam
 Minendra Rijal
 Mohammad Aftab Alam

CPN (Maoist Centre)

 Surendra Karki
 Ganga Bahadur Tamang
 Hem Kumar Rai
 Suresh Kumar Rai
 Shyam Kumar Shrestha
 Haribol Gajurel
 Agni Prasad Sapkota
 Hari Raj Adhikari
 Kamala Rokka
 Krishna Bahadur Mahara
 Tek Bahadur Basnet
 Gajendra Bahadur Mahat
 Suresh Chandra Das
 Santa Kumar Tharu
 Jayapuri Gharti
 Sashi Shrestha
 Yashoda Gurung Subedi
 Chudamani Khadka
 Purna Kumari Subedi
 Dharmasheela Chapagain
 Satya Pahadi
 Indu Kumari Sharma
 Ram Kumari Chaudhary
 Durga Kumari Bishwakarma
 Bodhmaya Kumari Yadav
 Dil Kumari Sah
 Chanda Tara Kumari
 Amrita Thapa
 Durga Bahadur Rawat

CPN (Unified Socialist)

 Kalilka Khatun
 Gopal Bahadur Bam
 Bhawani Prasad Khapung
 Hira Chandra KC
 Mukunda Neupane
 Kalyani Kumari Khadka
 Nira Devi Jairu
 Sarala Yadav
 Pushpa Kumari Karna Kayastha
 Samina Hussein
 Parbani Kumari Bishunkhe
 Laxmi Chaudhary
 Bina Budhathoki

People's Socialist Party
 Surya Narayan Yadav
 Hari Narayan Rauniyar
 Rani Mandal
 Lila Devi Sitaula
 Renu Kumari Yadav
 Nar Maya Dhakal

Loktantrik Samajwadi Party
 Bimal Prasad Shrivastav
 Chandra Kant Chaudhary
 Kali Devi Bishwakarma
 Dulari Devi Khatweni
 Nirajala Raut

Nepal Socialist Party
 Baburam Bhattarai

Nagarik Unmukti Party
 Resham Lal Chaudhary

Independent
 Chakka Bahadur Lama

Surveys and opinion polls

Exit polls

Results

Results by constituency

Results by province

Party list

Constituency

Notable losses

Former prime minister to lose in the election 

 Jhala Nath Khanal – Ilam 1 (CPN (Unified Socialist))

Outgoing cabinet ministers to lose in the election 

 Bal Krishna Khand – Rupandehi 3 (Nepali Congress)
 Pampha Bhusal – Lalitpur 3 (CPN (Maoist Centre))
 Umakant Chaudhary – Bara 1 (Nepali Congress)
 Maheshwar Jung Gahatraj – Banke 1 (CPN (Maoist Centre))
 Jeevan Ram Shrestha – Kathmandu 8 (CPN (Unified Socialist))

Outgoing ministers of state to lose in the election 

 Umesh Shrestha – Chitwan 2 (Nepali Congress)

Former chief ministers to lose in the election 

 Sherdhan Rai – Bhojpur 1 (CPN (UML))
 Shankar Pokharel – Dang 2 (CPN (UML))

Seats that changed hands 

From CPN (UML) to Congress (32)
 Achham 2
 Bajura 1
 Banke 3
 Bhaktapur 2
 Dailekh 2
 Darchula 1
 Dhading 2
 Gulmi 1
 Kailali 5
 Kanchanpur 2
 Kanchanpur 3
 Kapilvastu 2
 Kathmandu 3
 Kathmandu 5
 Lalitpur 1
 Manang 1
 Morang 1
 Morang 3
 Morang 6
 Mustang 1
 Myagdi 1
 Nawalpur 2
 Nuwakot 2
 Okhaldhunga 1
 Parasi 1
 Sankhuwasabha 1
 Sindhuli 1
 Surkhet 1
 Surkhet 2
 Syangja 1
 Syangja 2
 Tanahun 2

From Maoist Centre to CPN (UML) (9)
 Arghakhanchi 1
 Banke 1
 Kanchanpur 1
 Kapilvastu 1
 Lamjung 1
 Mahottari 1
 Sarlahi 3
 Solukhumbu 1
 Udayapur 2

From Congress to CPN (UML) (7)
 Bara 1
 Kapilvastu 3
 Morang 2
 Rupandehi 5
 Siraha 1
 Sunsari 2
 Sunsari 3

From Maoist Centre to Congress (5)
 Gorkha 1
 Jhapa 1
 Kailali 4
 Ramechhap 1
 Sindhupalchok 2

From Unified Socialist to CPN (UML) (4)
 Ilam 1
 Lalitpur 2
 Makwanpur 2
 Palpa 2

From LSP-N to Congress (4)
 Dhanusha 2
 Parsa 2
 Parsa 4
 Saptari 3

From Unified Socialist to Congress (4)
 Dang 3
 Mugu 1
 Tanahun 1
 Tehrathum 1

From CPN (UML) to Unified Socialist (4)
 Achham 1
 Bajhang 1
 Dailekh 1
 Dhading 1

From Maoist Centre to Independent (3)
 Bardiya 2
 Morang 5
 Rautahat 3

From CPN (UML) to Swatantra (3)
 Chitwan 1
 Chitwan 2
 Kathmandu 7

From PSP-N To CPN (UML) (2)
 Bara 3
 Parsa 3

From Congress to Independent (2)
 Rautahat 2
 Sarlahi 4

From Nepal Socialist Party to Maoist Centre (2)
 Gorkha 2
 Sarlahi 2

From Maoist Centre to PSP-N (2)
 Dhanusha 1
 Siraha 2

From Maoist Centre to RPP (2)
 Chitwan 3
 Jumla 1

From CPN (UML) to Maoist Centre (2)
 Dolakha 1
 Khotang 1

From CPN (UML) to RPP (2)
 Makwanpur 1
 Rupandehi 3

From Unified Socialist to Swatantra (2)
 Kathmandu 2
 Kathmandu 8

From LSP-N to Unified Socialist (2)
 Bara 4
 Rautahat 3

From PSP-N to Congress (1)
 Mahottari 4

From Janamorcha to CPN (UML) (1)
 Pyuthan 1

From LSP-N to CPN (UML) (1)
 Dhanusha 3

From PSP-N to Janamat (1)
 Saptari 2

From CPN (UML) to Janamorcha (1)
 Baglung 1

From Congress to LSP-N (1)
 Rupandehi 4

From Independent to Maoist Centre (1)
 Humla 1

From CPN (UML) to Nagrik Unmukti (1)
 Kailali 2

From Maoist Centre to Nagrik Unmukti (1)
 Kailali 3

From RJP-N to Nagrik Unmukti (1)
 Kailali 1

From CPN (UML) to PSP-N (1)
 Sunsari 1

From Congress to RPP (1)
 Parasi 2

From PSP-N to RPP (1)
 Banke 2

From Congress to Swatantra (1)
 Kathmandu 6

From Maoist Centre to Swatantra (1)
 Lalitpur 3

From Maoist Centre to Unified Socialist (1)
 Salyan 1

Analysis and aftermath

There were 12 political parties that were represented at the House of Representatives following the election. Only seven parties met the three percent threshold set in proportional voting to become national parties.

Nepali Congress emerged as the largest party after the elections winning 89 seats. The Democratic Left Alliance won 136 seats at the election but failed to get a majority by two seats. The alliance were in talks with Janamat Party and  Nagrik Unmukti Party in order to gain a majority in the House of Representatives.

CPN (UML) won 78 seats at the election and was the second largest party in the House of Representatives. The party however got the most votes in the party list proportional system.

President Bidya Devi Bhandari called on the parties to form a government on 19 December 2022, after the final results of the election were presented to her by the Election Commission. Pashupati Shamsher Jang Bahadur Rana from the Rastriya Prajatantra Party, as the senior-most member of the new House of Representatives, was sworn in on 21 December 2022 by the president. He administered the oath of office to the newly elected members of the House of Representatives on 22 December 2022.

After power sharing talks between the Democratic Alliance broke down on 25 December 2022, CPN (Maoist Centre) chairman Pushpa Kamal Dahal presented his claim for the post of prime minister with the support of CPN (UML), Rastriya Swatantra Party, Rastriya Prajatantra Party, People's Socialist Party, Janamat Party, Nagrik Unmukti Party and three independents. Dahal was sworn in as prime minister for the third time the next day with an eight member cabinet consiting of MPs from his party, CPN (UML), Rastriya Swatantra Party and Janamat Party, with the confidence and supply of RPP, PSP, NUP and three independents.

The inaugural session was scheduled for 9 January 2023. Dahal secured a vote of confidence on 10 January 2023 with 268 votes in his favor and only two MPs from Nepal Majdoor Kisan Party and Rastriya Janamorcha voting against him.

The CPN (UML) withdrew from the coalition on 27 February 2023, citing Dahal's decision to back an opposition candidate supported by the Nepali Congress in the upcoming presidential election. Dahal had announced this in order to gain the support of NC in the legislature. A vote of confidence is due within 30 days of the loss of a legislative majority. The Rastriya Prajatantra Party had withdrawn support days prior due to the same issue. The Rastriya Swatantra Party had also previously withdrawn its ministers from the government, although remained supportive under a confidence-and-supply agreement.

See also 
2022 Nepalese National Assembly election
2022 Nepalese provincial elections
2022 Nepalese local elections
2021 split in Nepalese communist parties
2021 split in the People's Socialist Party, Nepal
2022 Madhesh Provincial Assembly election

Notes

References

External links 

 प्रतिनिधि सभा समानुपातिक निर्वाचन प्रणाली तर्फ निर्वाचित सदस्यहरुको विवरण (Report of members elected to the House of Representatives via proportional voting) (in Nepali)

General
General elections in Nepal
November 2022 events in Nepal